Valkenisse is a former municipality in the Dutch province of Zeeland, on the peninsula of Walcheren.

Valkenisse was created in 1966 in a merger of Biggekerke, Koudekerke and Zoutelande, and existed until 1997, when it was merged into Veere.

The municipality was named after the two hamlets Groot-Valkenisse and Klein-Valkenisse.

References

States and territories established in 1966
1966 establishments in the Netherlands
Municipalities of the Netherlands disestablished in 1997
Former municipalities of Zeeland
Veere